Phacelia leonis is a rare species of phacelia known by the common name Siskiyou phacelia. It is endemic to the Klamath Mountains of southern Oregon and far northern California, where it grows in serpentine soils in the coniferous forests.

Description
Phacelia leonis is an annual herb producing a usually unbranched erect stem up to 15 centimeters tall. It is glandular and lightly hairy in texture. The narrow, tapering leaves are 1 to 3 centimeters long. The hairy inflorescence is a one-sided cyme of bell-shaped flowers. Each flower is only 2 or 3 millimeters long and light blue or lavender in color.

External links
Jepson Manual Treatment - Phacelia leonis

leonis
Flora of California
Flora of Oregon
Flora of the Klamath Mountains
Endemic flora of the United States
Flora without expected TNC conservation status